The Torneio do Norte (English: North Tournament) was a football competition held between 1968 and 1971. The champion of the tournament gained a place in the Torneio Norte-Nordeste of the same year.

List of champions

References

1968 establishments in Brazil
Defunct football cup competitions in Brazil
1971 disestablishments in Brazil
Torneio do Norte